Mary Ann Allard Booth (September 8, 1843 – September 15, 1922) was an American microscopist.

Biography

Booth was born on September 8, 1843, in Longmeadow, Massachusetts to Samuel and Rhoda Colton Booth.  She attended public schools and Wilbraham Academy. Her father was a scientist, and she inherited his interest for scientific studies.  At her home in Springfield she had a fully equipped laboratory where she prepared and stored microscope slides. Booth travelled extensively around the United States and Canada, and was interested in photography. She prepared the micrographs used by Rupert Blue during his efforts to stop bubonic plague in San Francisco.

Elected as one of the first female Fellows of the Royal Microscopical Society in 1889, Booth was also a Fellow of the American Association for the Advancement of Science. Her other association memberships include the Royal Photographic Society, the American Microscopic Society, the Brooklyn Institute of Arts and Sciences, and the Daughters of the American Revolution.

Noted for her preparation of diatoms and pollens, Booth earned a Diploma of Honor in Entomology (Women's Department) at the 1884–85 New Orleans World's Industrial and Cotton Centennial Exposition. In 1916, Booth donated a series of her photomicrographs to the Springfield Museum of Natural History.

Booth died on September 15, 1922.

Microscopy
Whilst suffering from an illness at her home, Booth acquired skills in preparing slides for microscopy for a variety of human parasites, and was considered to have the largest private collection of them. She won a range of awards for her work, edited Practical Microscopy between 1900 and 1907, and was elected a fellow of the Royal Microscopical Society and Royal Photographic Society.

References

1843 births
1922 deaths
Microscopists
Women microbiologists
People from Longmeadow, Massachusetts
People from Springfield, Massachusetts
Wilbraham & Monson Academy alumni
19th-century American women scientists
Fellows of the Royal Microscopical Society
American microbiologists